The 5th Vanier Cup was played on November 21, 1969, at Varsity Stadium in Toronto, Ontario, and decided the CIAU football champion for the 1969 season. The Manitoba Bisons won their first ever championship by defeating the McGill Redmen by a score of 24-15.

References

External links
 Official website

Vanier Cup
Vanier Cup
1969 in Toronto
November 1969 sports events in Canada
Canadian football competitions in Toronto